King Lear Peak is a summit in the Jackson Mountains of Humboldt County, Nevada, overlooking the Black Rock Desert to the west.

Cultural References
King Lear Peak is referenced in the final section of the 1996 epic poem Mountains and Rivers Without End by Gary Snyder, entitled “Finding the Space in the Heart.”

References 

Mountains of Humboldt County, Nevada